Thomas William Sexton (March 14, 1865 – February 8, 1934) was a Major League Baseball player. He played twelve games for the Milwaukee Brewers of the Union Association in 1884. He played from 1883-1887 in the Northwestern League.

Sources

Major League Baseball shortstops
Milwaukee Brewers (UA) players
19th-century baseball players
Baseball players from Illinois
Milwaukee Brewers (minor league) players
Quincy Quincys players
Binghamton Bingoes players
Toledo Avengers players
Duluth Freezers players
1865 births
1934 deaths